Hyolithohelminths are phosphatic tubular fossils from the Cambrian period.  They were sedentary, possibly infaunal, organisms; once thought to have opercula (hence the comparison with hyoliths), these structures are now understood to be unrelated shells.

References

Cambrian animals